Gerhard Melvin Dahl (June 8, 1876 – December 29, 1953) was an American financier.

He was born in Fort Howard, Brown County, Wisconsin to Theodore Halverson Dahl, a Lutheran minister, and Rebekka Oline (Gjertsen) Dahl, who immigrated from Norway in about 1865. Dahl was a graduate of the University of Wisconsin, and as an attorney served as City Attorney and later was elected District Attorney in Portage County, Wisconsin. On June 5, 1900 Dahl married his first wife, Georgeana (Cate) Dahl, the youngest daughter of Judge George Washington Cate of Stevens Point, Portage county, Wisconsin, who served one term in the U.S. House of Representatives as a Democrat. In 1902 the Dahls suffered the loss of their only child, George Theodore Dahl, before his first birthday.

In 1910 Dahl was appointed Street Railroad Commissioner in Cleveland, Ohio. In 1912 went to work for Sidney V. Mitchell as vice president of Electric Bond and Share Company (engaged in financing and managing public utilities in many states). On January 1, 1917 Dahl became a vice president of Chase Bank in New York City. In that position he led the three-year successful reorganization of the New Orleans Railway and Light Company.

The Brooklyn–Manhattan Transit Corporation in New York was set up in 1923 with as its chairman. He was originally a member of the BRT reorganization committee when William S. Menden was president. Their goal was to re-vitalize the BMT, improve service, improve its public image, and enhance shareholder value. Dahl was chairman of the board of BMT from 1924-1943. For many years Dahl and NYC Mayor John Hylan feuded about transit issues in a bitter, personal and public way.  There are many articles in New York papers about this feud. Dahl published the book "Transit Truths" in 1924 to educate the public about the issues.

Dahl became a millionaire as chairman of BMT and was on the board of directors of dozens of corporations. He and his wife Georgeana lived in the Ritz Tower Apartment Hotel in New York City, located at the crossroads of the Upper East Side - the corner of 57th Street and Park Avenue, where exclusive shops and artistic enterprises on 57th met luxury apartment buildings on Park Avenue. The Ritz-Carlton Company managed the building and its restaurants. The Dahls wintered in Palm Beach, Florida (traveling back and forth in a private railroad car) and entertained lavishly at the Whitehall luxury hotel. They maintained a yacht in Florida, an estate in Smithtown, Long Island worth $500,000, belonged to several golf, tennis and yacht clubs, and raised horses and Great Dane dogs.

On February 8, 1924, the body of 26-year-old musician and aspiring actress Louise Lawson, a flapper originally from Walnut Springs, Texas, was discovered in her apartment, murdered by suffocation. The detectives found expensive furniture, a healthy bank account, and a framed picture of a man that was identified as Gerhard Dahl. Mr. Dahl did know her and her parents in connection with supporting her musical career. Louise was known to several prominent New Yorkers. Mr. Dahl offered to cooperate with the investigation, and was never further implicated in her death by any prosecution.

In the late 1920s Dahl took to gambling, and joined the Sons of Hope (always hoping to improve their hands), a group of prominent wealthy men who met to drink and gamble. The table limit was $2,000. In John F. Kennedy's book, Why England Slept, he described an epic poker battle between Dahl and New York journalist Herbert Bayard Swope as "a battle to the death between the two greatest extraverts of the Western World."  At this time in his life his assets were worth about $5,000,000. Frederick K. Strauss, a man of Wall Street, once told a mutual friend that, "In dealing with him (Dahl), you are dealing with the most arrogant man in New York."

Around the time of the stock market crash and into the Great Depression, Dahl had huge loans with Chase National Bank, at one time reaching $4,758,000. On 15 Jun 1932 he owed Chase $3,183,358.19, which was written down to $615,000. Chase National Bank held Dahl's BMT stock as collateral. In early June 1932 Chase sold 55,000 of those shares before the price dropped drastically. This was before insider stock trading became illegal. Dahl was innocent and in fact protested against the sale, but Albert H. Wiggin, president of Chase, was also part of BMT and used the insider information to maximize their stock sale value. (See "The causes of the 1929 stock market crash: a speculative orgy or a new era?" by Harold Bierman, and "Privileged Characters" book by Morris Robert Werner)

After the death of his wife in 1949, Dahl became addicted to alcohol and barbiturates. His world collapsed until he had about $10.50 in the bank and he checked himself into Bellevue Hospital to kick the habits at age 74. Dahl married a second time to Mary E. Echevarria in 1952.

Dahl died at Brooklyn Hospital on December 29, 1953. A private funeral was held for him two days later in Manhattan.

References

Further reading
In Jun-Jul 1951 a three-article series in the American Weekly by Gerry Dahl on his life reminiscences was published, and is the source for much of the information in this article.

1876 births
1953 deaths
American financiers
American people of Norwegian descent
People from Green Bay, Wisconsin
University of Wisconsin–Madison alumni
Wisconsin lawyers
People from Portage County, Wisconsin